Sir Michael Grenfell Daniell  (born ) is a New Zealand electrical engineer and businessman. He was chief executive officer of Fisher & Paykel Healthcare from 2001 until 2016. In the 2021 Queen's Birthday Honours, he was appointed a Knight Companion of the New Zealand Order of Merit, for services to business, healthcare and governance.

References

1950s births
Living people
New Zealand electrical engineers
New Zealand businesspeople
Knights Companion of the New Zealand Order of Merit
Businesspeople awarded knighthoods